Cha 110913−773444 (sometimes abbreviated Cha 110913) is an astronomical object surrounded by what appears to be a protoplanetary disk. It lies at a distance of 529 light-years from Earth. There is no consensus yet among astronomers whether to classify the object as a sub-brown dwarf (with planets) or a rogue planet (with moons).

Cha 110913−773444 was discovered in 2004 by Kevin Luhman and others at Pennsylvania State University using the Spitzer Space Telescope and the Hubble Space Telescope, as well as two Earth-bound telescopes in Chile.

See also 
 OTS 44, a rogue planet
 SCR 1845-6357, a binary system with a faint red dwarf and a brown dwarf
 PSO J318.5−22, a rogue planet

References

Notes 

Rogue planets
Free-floating substellar objects
Circumstellar disks
Chamaeleon (constellation)
?